This is a list of 118 species in Chalcodermus, a genus of snout and bark beetles in the family Curculionidae.

Chalcodermus species

 Chalcodermus acaciae Bondar, 1960 c
 Chalcodermus aeneus Boheman, 1837 i c b  (cowpea curculio)
 Chalcodermus aeratus Fiedler, 1937 c
 Chalcodermus albosquamosus Fiedler, 1943 c
 Chalcodermus alternans Fiedler, 1937 c
 Chalcodermus angularis Champion, 1904 c
 Chalcodermus angulicollis Fåhraeus, 1837 c
 Chalcodermus armipes Boheman, 1837 c
 Chalcodermus ater Fiedler, 1937 c
 Chalcodermus aterrimus Fiedler, 1952 c
 Chalcodermus aureolus Fiedler, 1937 c
 Chalcodermus bicolor Fiedler, 1936 c
 Chalcodermus bimaculatus Fiedler, 1937 c
 Chalcodermus bituberculatus Fiedler, 1937 c
 Chalcodermus bondari Ogloblin, 1934 c
 Chalcodermus calidus Schoenherr, 1837 c
 Chalcodermus camposi Bondar, 1939 c
 Chalcodermus canavaliae Bondar, 1942 c
 Chalcodermus capichaba Bondar, 1948 c
 Chalcodermus castaneus Fiedler, 1937 c
 Chalcodermus cicatricosus Fiedler, 1937 c
 Chalcodermus coerulescens Fiedler, 1937 c
 Chalcodermus collaris Horn, 1873 i c b  (partridge-pea weevil)
 Chalcodermus crassipes Champion, 1904 c
 Chalcodermus crassirostris Fiedler, 1937 c
 Chalcodermus cupreipes Champion, 1904 c
 Chalcodermus cupreofulgens Fiedler, 1952 c
 Chalcodermus cupreolus Fiedler, 1936 c
 Chalcodermus cupreus Dejean, 1835 c
 Chalcodermus curvifasciatus Fiedler, 1937 c
 Chalcodermus curvipes Champion, 1904 c
 Chalcodermus dentiferus Faust, 1893 c
 Chalcodermus dentipennis Fiedler, 1936 c
 Chalcodermus dentipes Champion, 1904 c
 Chalcodermus ebeninus Boheman, 1837 c
 Chalcodermus fossulatus Fiedler, 1937 c
 Chalcodermus foveolatus Champion, 1904 c
 Chalcodermus fulgens Fiedler, 1937 c
 Chalcodermus geniculatus Fiedler, 1937 c
 Chalcodermus gibbifrons Bondar, 1948 c
 Chalcodermus globicollis Fiedler, 1937 c
 Chalcodermus heteropteri Bondar, 1948 c
 Chalcodermus humeralis Fiedler, 1936 c
 Chalcodermus humeridens Faust, 1893 c
 Chalcodermus humerosus Fiedler, 1937 c
 Chalcodermus imperfectus Fiedler, 1937 c
 Chalcodermus inaequicollis Horn, 1873 i c b
 Chalcodermus insularis Chevrolat, 1880 c
 Chalcodermus irregularis Fiedler, 1936 c
 Chalcodermus kirschi Deichmüller, J.V., 1881 c g
 Chalcodermus lateralis Fiedler, 1937 c
 Chalcodermus laticollis Fiedler, 1936 c
 Chalcodermus lineatus Champion, 1904 c
 Chalcodermus longirostris Fåhraeus, 1837 c
 Chalcodermus lunatus Bondar, 1948 c
 Chalcodermus malpighiaceae Bondar, 1960 c
 Chalcodermus marshalli Bondar, c
 Chalcodermus martini Van Dyke, 1930 i c b
 Chalcodermus metallescens Fiedler, 1937 c
 Chalcodermus metallinus (Fabricius, J.C., 1792) c g
 Chalcodermus mexicanus Champion, 1904 c
 Chalcodermus micans Fiedler, 1937 c
 Chalcodermus niger Hustache, 1924 c
 Chalcodermus nigroaeneus Champion, 1904 c
 Chalcodermus nigromaculatus Fiedler, 1937 c
 Chalcodermus nigroruber Fiedler, 1952 c
 Chalcodermus nitens Fiedler, 1937 c
 Chalcodermus opacus Fiedler, 1937 c
 Chalcodermus ovalis Fiedler, 1936 c
 Chalcodermus ovatulus Fiedler, 1936 c
 Chalcodermus perforatus Chevrolat, c
 Chalcodermus persimilis O'Brien in Heard, O'Brien, Forno & Burcher, 1998 c
 Chalcodermus piceus Fiedler, 1937 c
 Chalcodermus plaumanni Kuschel, 1958 c
 Chalcodermus plicaticollis Fåhraeus, 1837 c
 Chalcodermus porosipennis Fiedler, 1954 c
 Chalcodermus pruinosus Boheman, 1845 c
 Chalcodermus pseudenedrus Fiedler, 1936 c
 Chalcodermus pupillatus O'Brien & Wibmer, 1982 c
 Chalcodermus radiatus Champion, 1904 c
 Chalcodermus renominatus Blackwelder, 1947 c
 Chalcodermus rhomboidalis Fiedler, 1936 c
 Chalcodermus roricatus Fåhraeus, 1837 c
 Chalcodermus rubicundus Fiedler, 1937 c
 Chalcodermus rubidus Fiedler, 1937 c
 Chalcodermus rubricatus Hustache, 1924 c
 Chalcodermus rubripennis Fiedler, 1952 c
 Chalcodermus rubrofasciatus Fiedler, 1937 c
 Chalcodermus rubromaculatus Hustache, 1924 c
 Chalcodermus rubronotatus Fåhraeus, 1837 c
 Chalcodermus rubrovarius Fiedler, 1937 c
 Chalcodermus rugosicollis Fiedler, 1937 c
 Chalcodermus scrobiculatus Fiedler, 1937 c
 Chalcodermus sculpturatus Fiedler, 1937 c
 Chalcodermus segnis Fiedler, 1937 c
 Chalcodermus semicostatus Schaeffer, 1904 i c b
 Chalcodermus serjaniae Bondar, 1948 c
 Chalcodermus serripes Fahraeus, 1837 i c b  (mimosa green-seed weevil)
 Chalcodermus sparsepilosus Bondar, 1948 c
 Chalcodermus speculifer Heller, 1906 c
 Chalcodermus spinifer Boheman, 1837 c
 Chalcodermus splendens Fiedler, 1937 c
 Chalcodermus splendidulus Fiedler, 1937 c
 Chalcodermus stigmatophylli Bondar, 1948 c
 Chalcodermus subaeneus Fiedler, 1937 c
 Chalcodermus subcostatus Fiedler, 1937 c
 Chalcodermus subnitens Fiedler, 1936 c
 Chalcodermus subrufus Fiedler, 1936 c
 Chalcodermus sulcatus Fiedler, 1943 c
 Chalcodermus tombacinus Fåhraeus, 1837 c
 Chalcodermus triangularis Fiedler, 1936 c
 Chalcodermus truncatipennis Fiedler, 1937 c
 Chalcodermus variolosus Champion, 1904 c
 Chalcodermus viridis Fiedler, 1937 c
 Chalcodermus vitraci Hustache, 1930 c
 Chalcodermus vittatus Champion, 1904 i c b
 Chalcodermus vochysiae Bondar, 1948 c
 Chalcodermus yvensi Bondar, 1942 c

Data sources: i = ITIS, c = Catalogue of Life, g = GBIF, b = Bugguide.net

References

Chalcodermus
Articles created by Qbugbot